A by-election was held for the New South Wales Legislative Assembly electorate of Bathurst on 9 March 1886 as a result of the appointment of Francis Suttor to the office of Postmaster-General in the Jennings ministry. Under the constitution, ministers in the Legislative Assembly were required to resign to recontest their seats in a by-election when appointed. Such ministerial by-elections were usually uncontested and on this occasion a poll was required for Bathurst and Redfern where Arthur Renwick was re-elected. The 7 other ministers were re-elected unopposed.

Dates

Result

Francis Suttor was appointed Postmaster-General in the Jennings ministry.

See also
Electoral results for the district of Bathurst
List of New South Wales state by-elections

References

1886 elections in Australia
New South Wales state by-elections
1880s in New South Wales